The 2006–07 Rugby Pro D2 is a French rugby union club competition. The season runs alongside the 2006-07 Top 14 competition, which is the highest club competition. At the end of the season, Auch were champions and thus automatically promoted to Top 14. They were eventually followed by Dax who beat La Rochelle in the final providing the second promotion place. Colomiers were relegated to Fédérale 1; Limoges finished in a relegation spot, but were reprieved when Gaillac were denied a professional license for the 2007–08 season due to serious financial problems. The 2006–07 season was also noted for Toulon's signing of top players such as Tana Umaga who played for them for a period during the season.

Final table

{| class="wikitable" width="450px" style="float:left; font-size:95%; margin-left:15px;"
|colspan="2" style="text-align:center" bgcolor="#FFFFFF" cellpadding="0" cellspacing="0"|Key to colors
|-
| style="background: #3fff00;" |     
|Champions automatically promoted to 2007-08 Top 14
|-
| style="background: #fde910;" |     
|Winner of playoffs between second- through fifth-place teams for the second promotion place
|-
| style="background: #ccccff;" |     
|Remaining participants in promotion playoffs
|-
| style="background: #ff79B4;" |     
|Relegated to Fédérale 1: Gaillac due to financial issues, Colomiers as bottom finisher.
|}

Promotion playoffs

Semifinals
 19 May Dax 18–6 Béziers
 19 May La Rochelle 21–17 Toulon

Final
 27 May Dax 22–16 La Rochelle at Stade Chaban-Delmas, Bordeaux

See also
 2006-07 Top 14 season

External links
 LNR.fr
 Table

2006–07
Pro D2